Gordon Watson is the name of:

Gordon Watson (antique dealer) (born 1954), British antique dealer
Gordon Watson (communist) (1912–1945), New Zealand communist, journalist and soldier
Gordon Watson (pianist) (1921–1999), Australian musician
Gordon Watson (footballer, born 1914) (1914–2001), English footballer
Gordon Watson (footballer, born 1971), English footballer
Gordon Watson (racing driver), British competitor at events such as the 1947 Ulster Trophy
Gordon Watson (squash player) (1916–1992), from Australia